Roman Torres (born March 30, 2002) is an American soccer player who plays as a midfielder for USL League One club North Texas SC.

Club career
Torres began his career as part of the youth academy at FC Dallas. On April 24, 2021, Torres made his senior debut for North Texas SC, the FC Dallas reserve side in USL League One, against Fort Lauderdale CF, coming on as a late substitute in a 4–2 victory.

Career statistics

References

External links
 Profile at the U.S. Soccer Development Academy

2002 births
Living people
American soccer players
Association football midfielders
North Texas SC players
USL League One players